This is a list of marae (Māori meeting grounds) in the West Coast, New Zealand.

In October 2020, the Government committed $248,376 from the Provincial Growth Fund to upgrade two marae  in the region, with the intention of creating 20 jobs.

Buller District

Westland District

See also
 Lists of marae in New Zealand
 List of schools in the West Coast, New Zealand

References

West Coast, New Zealand, List of marae in the
Marae
Marae in the West Coast, New Zealand, List of